The 1993 Indiana Hoosiers football team represented Indiana University Bloomington as a member of the Big Ten Conference during the 1993 NCAA Division I-A football season. Led by tenth-year head coach Bill Mallory, the Hoosiers compiled an overall record of 8–4 with a mark of 5–3 in conference play, placing in a three-way tie for fourth in the Big Ten. Indiana was invited to the Independence Bowl, where they lost to Virginia Tech, 45–20. The team played home games at Memorial Stadium in Bloomington, Indiana.

Schedule

Roster

1994 NFL draftees

References

Indiana
Indiana Hoosiers football seasons
Indiana Hoosiers football